Yao Lambert Amani (born 17 September 1963) is an Ivorian footballer. He played in 18 matches for the Ivory Coast national football team from 1986 to 1994. He was also named in the Ivory Coast's squad for the 1988 African Cup of Nations tournament.

References

External links
 

1963 births
Living people
Ivorian footballers
Ivory Coast international footballers
1988 African Cup of Nations players
Association football midfielders
Africa Sports d'Abidjan players
ASEC Mimosas players
Ivorian football managers
Africa Sports d'Abidjan managers